James Duthie (23 September 1923 – 8 February 1972) was a Scottish professional footballer who played as a wing half.

References

1923 births
1972 deaths
Footballers from Angus, Scotland
Scottish footballers
Association football wing halves
Grimsby Town F.C. players
Hull City A.F.C. players
Southend United F.C. players
Bury Town F.C. players
English Football League players
People from Forfar